Speed-Dating is a 2010 film written and directed by Joseph A. Elmore Jr. and starring Wesley Jonathan, Chris Elliott, and Holly Robinson Peete.

Plot
Best friends Dog (Chico Benymon) and Beaver (Leonard Robinson) have difficulty ever meeting women.  No matter what they do, nothing ever goes right for them. That all changes when the best friend Too Cool (Wesley Jonathan) invites them to try out a round of speed dating.

Cast
 Wesley Jonathan as "Too Cool"
 Mekita Faiye as Danielle
 Chico Benymon as "Dog"
 Leonard Robinson as "Beaver"
 Vanessa Simmons as Elizabeth
 Chris Elliott as Inspector Green
 Holly Robinson Peete as Gayle
 Clint Howard as Dom
 Camille Mana as Kiki

Reception
Jeanette Catsoulis from The New York Times disliked the picture:

On the other hand, Nick Pinkerton from The Village Voice gave the film a mixed to positive review:

See also
List of black films of the 2010s

References

External links 

2010 films
2010 romantic comedy films
African-American films
American romantic comedy films
2010s English-language films
American sex comedy films
2010s sex comedy films
2010s American films